5-nitrosalicylate dioxygenase (naaB (gene)) is an enzyme with systematic name 5-nitrosalicylate:oxygen 1,2-oxidoreductase (decyclizing). This enzyme catalyses the following chemical reaction

 5-nitrosalicylate + O2  2-oxo-3-(5-oxofuran-2-ylidene)propanoate + nitrite (overall reaction)
(1a) 5-nitrosalicylate + O2  4-nitro-6-oxohepta-2,4-dienedioate
(1b) 4-nitro-6-oxohepta-2,4-dienedioate  2-oxo-3-(5-oxofuran-2-ylidene)propanoate + nitrite (spontaneous reaction)

The enzyme from soil bacterium Bradyrhizobium sp. JS329 participates in 5-nitroanthranilate degradation.

References

External links 
 

EC 1.13.11